The  is a ten-member body to approve the statutory matters on the Imperial House of Japan. The Council was established in 1947, when the current Imperial Household Law took effect.

Functions 
The Imperial Household Law provides that the Council shall be summoned by the prime minister to approve of:

 Marriage of any male member of the Imperial Family (Article X)
 Forfeiture of the Imperial status of a member of the Imperial Family (Articles XI, XIII and XIV)
 Changing of the order of succession of an heir who suffers from incurable disease (Article III)
 Regency (Articles XVI, XVIII and XX)

The Imperial Household Council has been convoked eight times hitherto. At each time, the Council meeting was headed by the Prime Minister and gave a unanimous consent and approval to the agenda.

Forfeiture of the Imperial status 
Fifty-one members lost their Imperial status in 1947 with an approval of the Council.

Approval of marriage 
The Council has discussed and approved of six marriages since its establishment.

No princess of the blood needs a marriage approval unless she marries a member of the Imperial House, because she will automatically become a commoner upon marriage and her husband will never be a member of the Imperial House under the rule of patrilineal succession. Seven princesses have married without the Council's approval since it was established.

Imperial abdication

In the summer of 2016, the aged Emperor Akihito indicated his desire to retire, leading to special legislation permitting the first abdication in over two centuries. The council met in December 2017 to formalize how and when the event would take place.

Members of the Imperial Household Council 
Article XXVIII of the Imperial Household Law provides that the Imperial Household Council shall consist of:
 Two members of the imperial family
 Prime minister
 The speaker and vice-speaker of the House of Representatives
 The president and vice-president of the House of Councillors
 Grand steward of the Imperial Household Agency
 Chief justice and one other justice of the Supreme Court

Article XXX of the Imperial Household Law provides that other ten members shall be appointed as reserve members of the Council:
 Minister of state - in most cases, chief cabinet secretary
 Two members of the Imperial Family
 Two members of the House of Representatives
 Two members of the House of Councillors
 An official of the Imperial Household Agency - in most cases, Vice-Grand Steward
 Two justices of the Supreme Court

Incumbent members of the Council in order of precedence 
 Fumihito, Crown Prince Akishino
 Hanako, Princess Hitachi
 Tadamori Oshima, Speaker of the House of Representatives
 Hirotaka Akamatsu Vice Speaker of the House of Representatives
 Akiko Santō, President of the House of Councillors
 Toshio Ogawa, Vice President of the House of Councillors
 Fumio Kishida, Prime Minister
 Shinichirō Yamamoto, Grand Steward
 Naoto Ōtani, Chief Justice of Japan
 Ryuko Sakurai, Associate Justice of the Supreme Court of Japan

The reserve members are as follows:
 Yuriko, Princess Mikasa
 Kiko, Princess Akishino
 Bunmei Ibuki
 Takahiro Yokomichi
 Seiko Hashimoto, member of the House of Councillors
 Yoshio Hachiro
 Tarō Asō, Deputy Prime Minister and Minister of Finance
 Yasuhiko Nishimura
 Kiyoko Okabe
 Takehiko Ōtani

Kōzoku Giin (Imperial Representative) 
, literally Imperial Representative, refers to the Imperial Family members elected as members of the Imperial Household Council by mutual election among the adult members of the Imperial Family excluding the emperor. They vote to elect two reserve members from the imperial family in the same way.

Princess Yori ceased to be a reserve member of the Council because she married on 10 October 1952 and thus became a commoner. Princess Takamatsu became a reserve member in replacement for her.

Recent elections 

On 3 September 2003, Prince Mikasa was reelected to his fifteenth consecutive term of office since the Council's establishment. Crown Prince Naruhito was voted out. It was for the first time since 1963 that the crown prince was not elected as a member or reserve member of the Council.

On 5 September 2007, Empress Michiko, six princes and nine princesses voted to elect Prince and Princess Hitachi as members of the Council, and Princess Mikasa and Prince Akishino as reserve members. Prince Mikasa was reported to have excused himself for his old age in advance. Crown Prince Naruhito was not elected again while his brother, Prince Akishino was voted in for the first time. The next election was in September 2011.

On 7 September 2011, the regular election was held by the 18 adult members of the imperial family. This time the elections were not held at the Imperial Palace, but in an Agency conference room to reduce energy consumption. Both the members and reserve members were re-elected.

See also 
 Government of Japan
 Imperial Household Agency

References 

 【明解要解】「皇室会議」とは？新議員に常陸宮ご夫妻, Sankei Shimbun
 Zusetsu - Koshitsu no Subete, Gakken, 2005,

External links 
  Kunaicho | Imperial Household Council

Government agencies established in 1947
Japanese monarchy
1947 establishments in Japan